Copper River may refer to several places:

Copper River (Alaska), in the United States
Copper River (British Columbia), a tributary of the Skeena River in Canada